Tsiklauri is a Georgian surname. Notable people with the surname include:

Beka Tsiklauri (born 1989), Georgian rugby union player
Mariam Tsiklauri (born 1960), Georgian poet, children's author and translator
Nino Tsiklauri (born 1993), Georgian alpine skier
Zurab Tsiklauri (born 1974), Russian footballer

Surnames of Georgian origin
Georgian-language surnames